Shavit Kimchi (born 12 January 2002) is an Israeli tennis player.

Kimchi has a career-high WTA singles ranking of 415, achieved on 25 July 2022. She also has a career-high WTA doubles ranking of 325, achieved on 25 July 2022. Kimchi has won 1 ITF singles and 4 doubles titles.

Kimchi represents Israel in the Fed Cup.

ITF Circuit finals

Singles: 1 (1 title)

Doubles: 9 (5 titles, 4 runner–ups)

References

External links
 
 
 
 

2002 births
Living people
Israeli female tennis players
21st-century Israeli women